Neil Bruce McKeown FRSE is a chemist who is currently Crawford Professor of Chemistry at the University of Edinburgh.

Education
He was educated at the University of East Anglia (BSc, 1984; PhD, 1987).

Honours
McKeown was awarded the Beilby Medal and Prize in 2008, and was elected a Fellow of the Royal Society of Edinburgh in 2017. He was awarded the Tilden Prize in 2017.

References

Year of birth missing (living people)
Living people
Alumni of the University of East Anglia
Academics of the University of Manchester
Academics of Cardiff University
Academics of the University of Edinburgh